The 2017 Nottinghamshire County Council election took place on 4 May 2017 as part of the 2017 local elections in the United Kingdom. The whole council of 66 councillors was elected for a four-year term spanning 56 electoral divisions, a minority of which return two councillors.  The voting system used is first-past-the-post.

The result was no overall party group of candidates formed a majority.  Before the election the council, had a one-councillor Labour Party majority — after the election the Labour Party formed the second-largest party group, with the Conservative party being the largest party. The Conservatives formed a coalition with the Mansfield Independent Forum which took control of the council, with the Conservative leader, Kay Cutts, being appointed leader of the council at the council's annual meeting following the election.

A review by the Local Government Boundary Commission for England led to altered boundaries for this election.

Overall election results

Results by electoral division

Ashfield District
(10 seats, 10 electoral divisions)

Ashfields

Hucknall North

Hucknall South

Hucknall West

Kirkby North

Kirkby South

Selston

Sutton Central & East

Sutton North

Sutton West

Bassetlaw District
(9 seats, 9 electoral divisions)

Blyth & Harworth

Misterton

Retford East

Retford West

Tuxford

Worksop East

Worksop North

Worksop South

Worksop West

Broxtowe Borough
(9 seats, 7 electoral divisions)

Beeston Central & Rylands

Bramcote & Beeston North

Eastwood

Greasley & Brinsley

Nuthall & Kimberley

Stapleford & Broxtowe Central

Toton, Chilwell & Attenborough

Gedling Borough
(9 seats, 6 electoral divisions)

Arnold North

Arnold South

Calverton

Carlton East

Carlton West

Newstead

Mansfield District
(9 seats, 5 electoral divisions)

East Mansfield

North Mansfield

South Mansfield

West Mansfield

Warsop

Newark & Sherwood District
(10 seats, 10 electoral divisions)

Balderton

Blidworth

Collingham

Farndon & Trent

Muskham & Farnsfield

Newark East

Newark West

Ollerton

Sherwood Forest

Southwell

Rushcliffe Borough
(10 seats, 9 electoral divisions)

Bingham East

Bingham West

Cotgrave

Keyworth

Leake & Ruddington

Radcliffe On Trent

West Bridgford North

West Bridgford South

West Bridgford West

References

2017
2017 English local elections
2010s in Nottinghamshire